Peter Hoar is a British director and of film and television, known for his work on Daredevil, The Umbrella Academy, Doctor Who and It's a Sin.

Career
Hoar studied Media Production at Bournemouth University in 1989, graduating in 1992. 

Hoar started out as a runner on Peak Practice, where he worked up to six years, working his way up the ladder to location manager and trainee director. He went on to direct on Channel 4 soap opera Hollyoaks, before moving into series dramas such as Wire in the Blood, The Innocence Project and Spooks.

As director
In 2011, Hoar directed A Good Man Goes to War, the mid-season finale of the sixth series of Doctor Who, starring Matt Smith and Karen Gillan. Directing Doctor Who marked a life-long ambition for Hoar, who was inspired by the show as a ten-year-old realizing "it was somebody's job to make that show." Doctor Who would make another appearance in one of Hoar's later projects, It's a Sin, where the lead character becomes an extra on the series in the 1980s.

Hoar then directed nine episodes of Da Vinci's Demons,  created by The Dark Knight story writer David S. Goyer. 

In 2016, Hoar made his Marvel debut directing three episodes of Daredevil for Netflix, with Charlie Cox in the leading role. The show marked Peter's first formal American TV credit, and the beginning of a long relationship with Marvel's television division. He went on to direct an episode of Iron Fist, Runaways, Cloak & Dagger, and The Defenders.

He continued working with Netflix, bringing two episodes of Altered Carbon to the screen. He later directed the first episode and finale of The Umbrella Academy season 1, based on the Dark Horse comic; marking his sixth comic book property adaptation for television.

It's a Sin
2021 saw the debut of Channel 4's drama It's a Sin, directed by Hoar and written by Russell T Davies. The importance of authentic casting and crewing of gay and queer actors and creatives became a pivotal talking point in the success of the series, with Peter and Russell often discussing this as a true asset for the show.

In March 2022, It's a Sin led the charge with 11 nominations for the BAFTA Television Awards, with a nomination for Peter as Best Director of Fiction, and Best Mini Series amongst them.

Peter was awarded winner of the 2022 BAFTA Award for Directing:Fiction at the BAFTA TV Craft Awards on 24 April 2022.

In late 2021 it was announced that Hoar would be re-teaming with Davies to direct a new 3-part series Nolly starring Helena Bonham Carter.

The Last of Us

Hoar was confirmed to be directing an episode of the long-anticipated live-action adaptation series in a filing by the Directors Guild of Canada in July 2021. That episode, titled "Long, Long Time", featured a love story between two middle-aged gay men surviving for years after a zombie apocalypse. Hoar felt a personal connection to the story, as a gay man himself.

References

External links 
 

Alumni of Bournemouth University
British television directors
LGBT television directors
British film directors
British film producers
Year of birth missing (living people)
Living people